The 1907 Cleveland Naps season was a season in American baseball. The team finished fourth in the American League with a record of 85–67, 8 games behind the Detroit Tigers.

Offseason 
In March 1907, Detroit Tigers manager Hughie Jennings offered Ty Cobb to the Cleveland Naps in exchange for Elmer Flick. The Naps refused the deal. Cobb went on to win the first of nine consecutive batting titles, and the Tigers won the AL pennant.

Regular season

Season standings

Record vs. opponents

Roster

Player stats

Batting

Starters by position 
Note: Pos = Position; G = Games played; AB = At bats; H = Hits; Avg. = Batting average; HR = Home runs; RBI = Runs batted in

Other batters 
Note: G = Games played; AB = At bats; H = Hits; Avg. = Batting average; HR = Home runs; RBI = Runs batted in

Pitching

Starting pitchers 
Note: G = Games pitched; IP = Innings pitched; W = Wins; L = Losses; ERA = Earned run average; SO = Strikeouts

Other pitchers 
Note: G = Games pitched; IP = Innings pitched; W = Wins; L = Losses; ERA = Earned run average; SO = Strikeouts

References 

1907 Cleveland Naps season at Baseball Reference

Cleveland Guardians seasons
Cleveland Naps season
1907 in sports in Ohio